This is a list of turnpikes built and operated by private companies in the U.S. state of New York, mainly in the 19th century. While most of the roads are still maintained as free public roads, some have been abandoned.

Background 
{
  "type": "ExternalData",
  "service": "page",
  "title": "New York Turnpikes.map"
}
Turnpikes, though common in Britain, were almost unheard of in their American colonies. After they had declared independence, the states' road networks were still in poor condition, often with state and local authorities being unable to effectively maintain their roads. The construction of the first turnpike in America, the Philadelphia and Lancaster Turnpike, sparked a wave of turnpike creation across the northeast. New York followed suit, chartering its first turnpike in 1797. In all, over 450 companies were chartered. Many were chartered to expand access to the state's western regions, others were chartered to be local connections to larger thru-routes, and there were still others meant to connect to other states.

For a turnpike to be created, a company must first have been chartered by the state legislature, as general incorporation law had yet to be widespread in its use. Vetoes of charters were rare, though they were known to happen. A company's charter created the framework for how a company was to operate. To raise capital, companies sold shares of their stock at a fixed rate. Then, the company would set about constructing their road, as prescribed in their charters. The methods of construction could range from a simple dirt road to a toilsome macadam construction. As much as two-thirds of companies in New York were unable to complete their roads in the time allotted by the legislature. However, if a company completed their road, they could begin to collect tolls on their road (or earlier, if allowed by the legislature). Toll booths were erected to accomplish this task, often residential homes with a small booth attached. Tolls varied based on the number of people and livestock travelling, and the type of vehicle travelled in. Exemptions were granted for, among other things, living near a toll booth, going to a house of worship, requesting a physician, or travelling armies. Should a road be not up to standards, gates were to be kept open to travellers until the road was in good condition. Local reaction to a turnpike varied; some communities welcomed a new turnpike, accepting the tolls as a civic duty to be paid, while others resisted by boycotting through shunpikes, lying to escape tolls, or outright vandalism.

The turnpike craze busted as soon as it boomed, challenged by the introduction of steamboats and railroads; the Erie Canal supplanted the need for cross-state turnpikes. Though many long distance turnpikes were doomed, some of the smaller, local turnpikes survived well into the 19th century, with a few surviving into the 20th century. With the introduction of plank roads, the chartering of traditional turnpikes fell out of fashion, with only a few more being chartered. Toll roads had become a memory a few decades into the 20th century, though the 1950s brought about the New York Thruway System, reintroducing toll roads to the state.

List

See also 
 List of plank roads in New York

References 

Franklin Ellis, History of Columbia County, New York, 1878, Chapter XIV